Below Deck Adventure is a reality television series hosted by Bravo that was announced on September 7, 2022, and premiered on November 1, 2022. The show is the 4th spin-off of the Below Deck franchise, after Below Deck Mediterranean, Below Deck Sailing Yacht and Below Deck Down Under. The show takes place on and off the luxury yacht "Mercury" which cruises among the Fjords of Norway. Building on the concept of the previous shows, this version of the show incorporates off-ship activities such as parasailing, bicycling and rock climbing engaged in by the yacht guests and crew. The show was filmed between July 25, 2021 and September 14, 2021, and was based out of the town of Ålesund, Norway.

Cast
Season 1: Mercury
Kerry Titheradge – Captain
Faye Clarke - Chief Stewardess
Jessica Condy - Chef
Lewis Lupton - Bosun
Oriana Schneps - Stewardess
Kasie Faddah - Stewardess
Nathan Morley - Deckhand
Kyle Dickard - Deckhand (ep.1-3)
Michael Gilman - Deckhand
Seth Jacobson - Deckhand (ep. 7-10), Lead Deckhand (ep. 10-13)

Episodes

References 

Where is Below Deck Season 9 Cast Now? What Happened To The Crew

External links 
 
 Below Deck Reality TV News
 

2022 American television series debuts
2020s American reality television series
Bravo (American TV network) original programming
English-language television shows
Below Deck (franchise)
Reality television spin-offs
Television shows filmed in Norway
American television spin-offs
Yachting